Otava may refer to:

 Otava (island), an island in the Baltic Sea
 Otava (publisher), Finnish publishing house
 Otava (river), river in the Czech Republic
 Otava (village), in Finland
 4405 Otava, an asteroid
 Hotel Otava, a hotel in Pori, Finland
 Zdeněk Otava (1902–1980), Czech opera singer
 a Finnish name for the asterism Big Dipper

See also
Ottava (disambiguation)
Ottawa (disambiguation)